is a Japanese musical group formed in 2006 especially to sing "Progress", the title song to the NHK program , known overseas as "The Professionals".

Members 
The group comprises Shikao Suga (vocals, composition, lyrics), Satoshi Takebe (production, lyrics, keyboard), Hirokazu Ogura (guitar), Takamune Negishi (bass), and Gota Yashiki (drums).

Discography

Singles 
Progress (August 2, 2006) - (Professional Shigoto no Ryuugi) theme song

Albums 
Progress (June 1, 2016)

References

External links
Sony Music Official site (Japanese)
Speedstar Records Official site (Japanese)
The Professionals Official site (English)
Professional Shigoto no Ryuugi Official site (Japanese)

Musical groups established in 2006
Japanese musical groups
Japanese musicians
Television theme songs
NHK
Kokua members